The Tripura football team is an Indian football team representing Tripura in Indian state football competitions including the Santosh Trophy.

Squad
The following 22 players were called for the 2022–23 Santosh Trophy.

References

Santosh Trophy teams
Football in Tripura